The National Liberation Party (PLN), nicknamed the  ("green and whites"), is a political party in Costa Rica. The party is a member of the Socialist International. Social-democratic by statute, the party has a few internal factions, including liberals, Third Way supporters, centrists, and social conservatives.

History 
In 1948 a rebel group called National Liberation Army commanded by caudillo José Figueres Ferrer led a rebellion against the government of then President Rafael Angel Calderón Guardia and his communist allies. After the Civil War the rebels were victorious and Figueres took power de facto. Yet, Figueres did not overrule the social reforms made by Calderón and allies, like Social Security, almost free college education and Labor Laws but kept them and even made a series of progressive reforms himself like abolishing the army and introducing taxation on capital. Figueres gave up power in favor of the democratically elected president Otilio Ulate in 1949.

In 1951 the Social Democratic Party, the Centre for the Study of National Problems and the group Democratic Action formed the National Liberation Party in October 12 in order to participate in the 1953 election, the first election since the civil war, with Figueres as nominee and democratic socialism as their ideology. This election was very controversial as many parties were unable to participate, among others Calderon’s Republican Party and the Communists. Figueres won easily over the only other candidate with 60% of the votes.

For the 1958 general election the PLN was split, as Jorge Rossi left the party after losing in the primaries and was basically an independent candidate thus splitting the Social Democrat vote. The PLN suffers it first defeat as oppositional candidate, liberal Mario Echandi, won the election with the support of Calderón. However, after this time PLN will be clearly Costa Rica’s dominant party in the political system as only when the opposition ran united were capable of winning. This was the case in the 1966 and 1978 election, the rest of the time PLN’s nominees tended to win easily.

In 1986 then younger leader Óscar Arias won the party’s nomination facing the traditional leadership of the party, including Figueres. Arias won also the country’s presidency and his role in the negotiation of a peace agreement to stop the Central American Wars earned him the Nobel Peace Prize. Some critics inside and outside the party pointed Arias’ administration as more neo-liberal than socialist and as a switch from PLN’s traditional progressive views.

Wasn’t until 1983 when the Unity Coalition merged into the Social Christian Unity Party that PLN had to confront what was basically a party of the same dimensions. It is after this time that Costa Rica enters a two-party system with PLN and PUSC as the two main political forces and between the two 90% of the vote casting. But in the 2000s a new party is founded by many former PLN and PUSC leaders, among them former minister and deputy Ottón Solís, former First Lady Margarita Penón (Óscar Arias’ ex-wife) and notable writer and journalist Alberto Cañas. The new party named Citizens Action Party attracted many progressive voters dissatisfied with PLN’s turn to the right and is often pointed as one of the reasons for PLN’s nominee Rolando Araya’s defeat in the 2002 general election. In any case, after PUSC’ catastrophic debacle in 2005 due to a series of corruption scandals PAC became PLN’s main political rival. This was particularly notorious in the 2006 election with Óscar Arias looking for re-election and PAC’s candidate Ottón Solís. Most Costa Ricans showed mixed feelings over Arias, some admiring him and some others very oppose to his figure. That and the issue of CAFTA that polarized public opinion as basically half the population was in favor and half against apparently was translated into the voting polls as Arias (who was pro-CAFTA) and Solís (who was anti-CAFTA) were practically tied after the election. Arias won by a very slight margin of some 22.000 votes after an exhaustive counting.

In the same year's parliamentary election, the party won 25 out of 57 seats. In the 2010 general election, Laura Chinchilla, the previous vice-president and the PLN candidate, won the election with an initial count of 47 percent.

A newspaper poll in July 2011 showed a decline in party popularity. Commentary on the poll pointed to an inherited fiscal crisis, border friction with Nicaragua, and natural disasters the previous November as contributing factors to public discontent.

In 2013 PLN’s candidate was San José Mayor since 1982 Johnny Araya (Rolando Araya’s brother) after other aspirants like former Presidential Minister Rodrigo Arias (Óscar Arias’ brother) and former president José María Figueres (José Figueres’ son) dropped from the race due to be very low in the polls making a primary unnecessary. Araya was the frontrunner for a while in most polls but he went second in the first electoral round earning only 29% of the votes, the lowest percentage ever for a PLN’s nominee, and behind PAC’s nominee Luis Guillermo Solís. For the run-off election Araya resign his candidacy arguing that he had no more money to run a campaign and that all polls showed him losing by wide margin. Effectively in the second round Solís won with 78% of the votes (1.3 million voters) and Araya gained only 22%.

Araya was expelled from the party after a resolution of the Ethics Committee due to his resignation as candidate in the second round (something unconstitutional, as the Constitution does not allow resigning a candidacy) thus Araya ran for Mayor of San José with a local party winning the election in the 2016 municipal election, in which PLN was the most voted party, yet it lost 14 mayoralties and received much fewer votes that in the previous municipal election.

The party, as then main opposition to Luis Guillermo Solís's government, went into a very divisive primary in which then deputy Antonio Álvarez Desanti won over former president José María Figueres. Internal fighting made impossible to reach an agreement among the factions leading to Figueres withdrawing his support of Desanti's nomination. Desanti, who had previously left the party whilst criticizing it for corruption and abandoning its social-democratic ideology, had the support of Oscar Arias and his brother Rodrigo, however. Nevertheless its results in the 2018 Costa Rican general election were crushing, as the party suffered its worst defeat in history with only 18% of votes and failing to gain a spot in the run-off ending as third for the first time in its history.

Electoral performance

Presidential

Parliamentary

References

External links
  

National liberation movements
Political parties in Costa Rica
Full member parties of the Socialist International
Social democratic parties
Political parties established in 1951
1951 establishments in Costa Rica